César Kist (born October 22, 1964) is a former professional tennis player from Brazil.

Kist enjoyed most of his tennis success while playing doubles.  During his career he finished runner-up at 2 doubles events.  He achieved a career-high doubles ranking of world No. 79 in 1987.

Career finals

Doubles (2 runner-ups)

References

External links
 
 

Brazilian male tennis players
1964 births
Living people
Brazilian people of German descent
People from Santa Cruz do Sul
Sportspeople from Rio Grande do Sul